La Más Draga is a Mexican reality competition television, where different drag queens compete by performing various challenges week after week to find La Más Draga of Mexico and Latin America, through different tests, whether it be singing, acting, comedy or dancing. The objective of the program is to make Mexico's drag art visible, with challenges that exalt Mexican culture. Every week a contestant is eliminated through a lipsync. The program is transmitted exclusively through YouTube.

Format 
The reality competition show is set as to have weekly challenges to eliminate the participants and thus find the best one. Each week the contestants face a series of challenges, guided and advised by Juan Carmona and guests. Each episode there is a mini-challenge and a runway walk according to a theme of Mexican culture where each participant demonstrates their versatility. The judges evaluate them in a gala where the two participants with the lowest score will go straight to lipsync, where only one participant will be saved. The eliminated one goes to the "drag-altar" where she will be the most dreamed of and forever remembered. La Más Draga of all Mexico is chosen from among the last three finalists.

Hosts

Judges

Series overview

Season 1 (2018) 
The first season of La Más Draga premiered on 8 May 2018 throughout YouTube. The season ran for seven episodes and concluded on 19 June 2018. Debra Men was voted as La Más Querida. Bárbara Durango, Eva Blunt, and Margaret Y Ya were the runner-ups, and Deborah "La Grande" was the winner of the first season.

Season 2 (2019) 
The second season of La Más Draga premiered on 30 April 2019 throughout YouTube. The season ran for nine episodes and concluded on 25 June 2019. Amelia was voted as La Más Querida and La Más Volada. Gvajardo and Sophia Jiménez were the runner-ups, and Alexis 3XL was the winner of the second season.

Season 3 (2020) 
The third season of La Más Draga premiered on 23 September 2020 throughout YouTube. The season ran for eleven episodes and concluded on 1 December 2020. Wynter was voted as La Más Querida and Luna Lansman as La Más Volada. Madison, Raga Diamante and Rudy Reyes were the runner-ups, and Aviesc Who? was the winner of the third season.

Season 4 (2021) 
The fourth season of La Más Draga premiered on 21 September 2021 throughout YouTube. The season ran for twelve episodes and concluded on 8 December 2021. Georgiana was voted as La Más Querida and Paper Cut as La Más Volada. C-Pher, Elektra Vandergeld and Iris XC were the runner-ups, and Rebel Mörk was the winner of the fourth season.

Season 5 (2022) 
The fifth season of La Más Draga premiered on 27 September 2022 throughout YouTube. The season ran for twelve episodes and concluded on 13 December 2022. Huma Kyle was voted as La Más Querida and Fifí Estah as La Más Volada. Hidden Mistake, Liza Zan Zuzzi and Paper Cut were the runner-ups, and Fifí Estah was the winner of the fifth season.

References 

Drag (clothing) television shows
Mexican LGBT-related television shows
Mexican reality television series